Unit 81 ("Unit eight - one") is a secret technology unit part of the Special Operations Division of the Military Intelligence Directorate, an independent service of the Israel Defense Forces (IDF). The unit focuses on building and supplying cutting-edge technologies to Israeli combat soldiers and spies. It often related to the Unit 8200 responsible for signal intelligence (SIGINT) and code decryption.

History 

The origin of the unit is unknown. The unit existed since at least the early days of the State of Israel in 1948 and was referred to as the "Intelligence Branch 8" but must have existed in some form long before the establishment of the country in Shai the secret service of the underground Jewish defense forces Haganah under the British Mandate of Palestine. The unit was then responsible for the development of special technologies and the training of the operators and agents responsible for operating them. It was later called Unit 432.

Operations 

All operations of the unit are highly classified. The unit consists mainly of military personnel, but civilians also serve in the unit including highly qualified experts in unique fields such as quantum physics, aerospace engineering, and nanotechnology.

Among other things, the unit develops advanced cyberwarfare weapons, tools for SIGINT, and combat systems used by the Sayeret Matkal the most elite special forces unit of the IDF that is also part of the Special Operations Division.

Achievements 

The unit was awarded 38 Israel Defense Prizes and a Chief of Staff Medal of Appreciation. It is the most decorated unit in the IDF.

According to a 2021 report by the Israeli business newspaper Calcalist in the last decade alone 100 veterans of the unit have founded 50 technology companies having raised US$4 billion with their accumulated valuations surpassing US$10 billion.

Unit Commanders

See also
 Unit 8200
 Talpiot program
Havatzalot Program
Mossad
 Technion – Israel Institute of Technology

References 

Military units and formations of Israel
Military Intelligence Directorate (Israel)